The Kakhonak River is a river in Alaska that flows from Kakhonak Lake into Iliamna Lake via Kakhonak Bay.  It is fast moving river with white water and four waterfalls.  It has a large fish population including trout, grayling and salmon.

Bud Branham built a cabin at Kakhonak Falls in 1949, which eventually grew into Kakhonak Falls Lodge, the first sportsmen's lodge in the Bristol Bay watershed.

See also
List of Alaska rivers

References

Rivers of Lake and Peninsula Borough, Alaska
Rivers of Alaska